Frail Words Collapse is the second studio album by American metalcore band As I Lay Dying. The album is their first release on the record label Metal Blade Records. This is also the last album to feature Evan White before his departure from the band shortly after the album's release. Two of the band's signature songs, "94 Hours" and "Forever", appear on the album.

Music videos have been produced for the songs "94 Hours" and "Forever". The album has sold 250,000 copies to date, according to Nielsen SoundScan.

The album gets its name from a lyric of one of the songs on it, "Falling upon Deaf Ears".

Track listing

Personnel 
Production and performance credits are adapted from the album liner notes.

As I Lay Dying
 Tim Lambesis – lead vocals, keyboards
 Evan White – guitars, bass
 Jordan Mancino – drums

Production
 Tim Lambesis – production
 Evan White – production
 Steve Russell – engineer, mixing
 Evan White – lead guitar, bass, production
 Dan de la Isla – assistant engineer, mixing
 Brad Vance – mastering
 Brandon O'Connell – pre-production
 Jacob Bannon – artwork

Additional musicians
 Dylan Plymale – guitars
 Tommy Garcia – backing vocals on "94 Hours"
 Johnny Upton – clean vocals on "Forever"
 Jarrod – clean vocals on "Distance is Darkness"

Charts

References

2003 albums
Albums with cover art by Jacob Bannon
As I Lay Dying (band) albums
Metal Blade Records albums